The Kunstkamera or Kunstkammer (German for "Culture Room" (literally) or "Art Chamber", typically used for a "cabinet of curiosities") is a public museum located on the Universitetskaya Embankment in Saint Petersburg, facing the Winter Palace. Its collection was first opened to the public at the Summer Palace by Peter the Great in 1714, making it Russia's first museum. Enlarged by purchases from the Dutch collectors Albertus Seba and Frederik Ruysch, the museum was moved to its present location in 1727.

History

As part of Peter the Great's establishment of St Petersburg as the new Russian capital, he established an imperial cabinet of curiosities dedicated to preserving "natural and human curiosities and rarities" in the manner of some of the other European courts since the 16th century. Such cabinets allowed rulers and the elite to acquire a fuller knowledge of the world and to demonstrate their control over it. Peter's personal collection was first exhibited to the public at the Summer Palace in 1714, which is used by the present museum as its founding date. Peter's main interest was in natural things rather than manmade ones. A major component of the original collection was a large assortment of human and animal fetuses with various birth defects, many of which Peter had acquired in 1697 from Frederick Ruysch and Levinus Vincent. Peter encouraged research into deformities, particularly in order to debunk superstitious fear of monsters. In particular, he issued an ukase ordering malformed stillborn infants to be sent from anywhere in Russia to the imperial collection. He subsequently had them put on show in the Kunstkamera as examples of accidents of nature. In 1716, he established a mineral cabinet for the Kunstkamera from a collection of 1195 samples which he had bought from the Danzig doctor Gottwald. He then expanded it with other curious or representative minerals from around Russia. (This collection was later separated to create what became the Fersman Mineralogical Museum, now in Moscow.)

The present Kunstkamera is a turreted Petrine Baroque building designed by Prussian architect Georg Johann Mattarnovy. Its foundation stone was laid in 1719 and it was fully completed in 1727. A separate building had become necessary after the purchase of large collections from the Dutch pharmacologist Albertus Seba in 1716 and the Dutch anatomist Frederik Ruysch in 1717. Examination and organization of these collections also spurred the creation of the Russian Academy of Sciences. A third acquisition came from Jacob de Wilde, a collector of gems and scientific instruments. These purchases were largely organized by Robert Erskine, Peter's chief physician, and his secretary Johann Daniel Schumacher.

Museum of Anthropology and Ethnography
In the 1830s, the Kunstkamera collections were dispersed to newly established imperial museums, the most important being the Peter the Great Museum of Anthropology and Ethnography, established in 1879. It has a collection approaching 2,000,000 items and has been known as the Peter the Great Museum since 1903 in order to distinguish it from the Russian Museum of Ethnography.

Originally, there were separate museums for anthropology and ethnography, but on 5 December 1878 it was decided to merge them into a single museum with Leopold Schrenk being appointed on 10 November 1879. It was not until 1887 that the museum was finally provided with its own exhibition premises attached to Kunstkamera in Tamozhennyi pereulok. On 23 September 1889, the first exhibition of the unified Museum was opened.

The head of Willem Mons, brother of Anna Mons, may have resided in the Kunstkamera from 1724 to around 1780. In 1747 some objects were lost in a fire. The museum houses 78 watercolours by the Peruvian artist Pancho Fierro, the largest collection outside Peru. These were brought back by Schrenk following his visit there in 1854.

List of directors 
 Leopold Schrenk (1879–94)
 Vasily Radlov (1894–1918)
 Vasily Bartold (1918–21)
 Yefim Karskiy (1921–30)
 Nikolay Matorin (1930–33)
 Ivan Meshchaninov (1934–37)
 Nikolai Kislyakov (1945–48)
 Nikolai Girenko (1991–92)
 Alexander Myl’nikov (1992–97)
 Chuner Taksami (1997–2001)
 Yuri Chistov (2001–present)

See also 
List of museums in Saint Petersburg
Globe of Gottorf (one of the museum's main artistic pieces)
Pushkin House (occupied the rooms in the Kunstkamera building in 1905–27)

Notes

Bibliography 
Vladimir Romanovich Arsenyev. 1999. Le musée d'Anthropologie et d'Ethnographie Pierre-le-Grand à Saint-Pétersbourg. Cahiers d'Études africaines 39, no. 155/156: 681–699.

External links

 Official website of the Kunstkamera 
 Kunstkamera, Peter the Great Museum of Anthropology and Ethnography (Saint Petersburg)
 Photo (1024 × 768)
 Peter’s collection lives on: Russia's oldest museum marks 300th birthday

Museums established in 1727
Medical museums in Russia
Natural history museums in Russia
Anthropology museums
Ethnographic museums in Saint Petersburg
Science museums in Saint Petersburg
Museums established in 1879
Universitetskaya Embankment
Institutes of the Russian Academy of Sciences
Baroque architecture in Saint Petersburg
Natural history museums in Saint Petersburg
1727 establishments in the Russian Empire
Cultural heritage monuments of federal significance in Saint Petersburg